This is a list of the bird species recorded in Burundi. The avifauna of Burundi include a total of 700 species, of which 3 have been introduced by humans.

This list's taxonomic treatment (designation and sequence of orders, families and species) and nomenclature (common and scientific names) follow the conventions of The Clements Checklist of Birds of the World, 2022 edition. The family accounts at the beginning of each heading reflect this taxonomy, as do the species counts found in each family account. Introduced and accidental species are included in the total counts for Burundi.

The following tags have been used to highlight several categories. The commonly occurring native species do not fall into any of these categories.

 (A) Accidental - a species that rarely or accidentally occurs in Burundi
 (I) Introduced - a species introduced to Burundi as a consequence, direct or indirect, of human actions

Ducks, geese, and waterfowl
Order: AnseriformesFamily: Anatidae

Anatidae includes the ducks and most duck-like waterfowl, such as geese and swans. These birds are adapted to an aquatic existence with webbed feet, flattened bills, and feathers that are excellent at shedding water due to an oily coating.

White-faced whistling-duck, Dendrocygna viduata
Fulvous whistling-duck, Dendrocygna bicolor
White-backed duck, Thalassornis leuconotus
Knob-billed duck, Sarkidiornis melanotos
Egyptian goose, Alopochen aegyptiacus
Spur-winged goose, Plectropterus gambensis
African pygmy-goose, Nettapus auritus
Garganey, Spatula querquedula
Blue-billed teal, Spatula hottentota
Northern shoveler, Spatula clypeata
Eurasian wigeon, Mareca penelope (A)
African black duck, Anas sparsa
Yellow-billed duck, Anas undulata
Cape teal, Anas capensis
Red-billed duck, Anas erythrorhyncha
Northern pintail, Anas acuta
Green-winged teal, Anas crecca (A)
Southern pochard, Netta erythrophthalma
Common pochard, Aythya ferina
Maccoa duck, Oxyura maccoa (A)

Guineafowl
Order: GalliformesFamily: Numididae

Guineafowl are a group of African, seed-eating, ground-nesting birds that resemble partridges, but with featherless heads and spangled grey plumage.

Helmeted guineafowl, Numida meleagris

Pheasants, grouse, and allies
Order: GalliformesFamily: Phasianidae

The Phasianidae are a family of terrestrial birds which consists of quails, partridges, snowcocks, francolins, spurfowls, tragopans, monals, pheasants, peafowls and jungle fowls. In general, they are plump (although they vary in size) and have broad, relatively short wings.

Coqui francolin, Campocolinus coqui
Ring-necked francolin, Scleroptila streptophora
Red-winged francolin, Scleroptila levaillantii
Blue quail, Synoicus adansonii
Harlequin quail, Coturnix delegorguei
Handsome francolin, Pternistis nobilis
Hildebrandt's francolin, Pternistis hildebrandti
Scaly francolin, Pternistis squamatus
Red-necked francolin, Pternistis afer

Flamingos
Order: PhoenicopteriformesFamily: Phoenicopteridae

Flamingos filter-feed on shellfish and algae. Their oddly shaped beaks are specially adapted to separate mud and silt from the food they consume and, uniquely, are used upside-down.

Greater flamingo, Phoenicopterus roseus
Lesser flamingo, Phoenicopterus minor

Grebes
Order: PodicipediformesFamily: Podicipedidae

Grebes are small to medium-large freshwater diving birds. They have lobed toes and are excellent swimmers and divers. However, they have their feet placed far back on the body, making them quite ungainly on land.

Little grebe, Tachybaptus ruficollis
Great crested grebe, Podiceps cristatus (A)
Eared grebe, Podiceps nigricollis

Pigeons and doves
Order: ColumbiformesFamily: Columbidae

Pigeons and doves are stout-bodied birds with short necks and short slender bills with a fleshy cere.

Rock pigeon, Columba livia (I)
Speckled pigeon, Columba guinea
Afep pigeon, Columba unicincta
Rameron pigeon, Columba arquatrix
Lemon dove, Columba larvata
Dusky turtle-dove, Streptopelia lugens
Mourning collared-dove, Streptopelia decipiens
Red-eyed dove, Streptopelia semitorquata
Ring-necked dove, Streptopelia capicola
Laughing dove, Streptopelia senegalensis
Emerald-spotted wood-dove, Turtur chalcospilos
Blue-spotted wood-dove, Turtur afer
Tambourine dove, Turtur tympanistria
Namaqua dove, Oena capensis (A)
African green-pigeon, Treron calva

Bustards
Order: OtidiformesFamily: Otididae

Bustards are large terrestrial birds mainly associated with dry open country and steppes in the Old World. They are omnivorous and nest on the ground. They walk steadily on strong legs and big toes, pecking for food as they go. They have long broad wings with "fingered" wingtips and striking patterns in flight. Many have interesting mating displays.

Denham's bustard, Neotis denhami
Black-bellied bustard, Lissotis melanogaster

Turacos
Order: MusophagiformesFamily: Musophagidae

The turacos, plantain eaters and go-away-birds make up the bird family Musophagidae. They are medium-sized arboreal birds. The turacos and plantain eaters are brightly coloured, usually in blue, green or purple. The go-away birds are mostly grey and white.

Great blue turaco, Corythaeola cristata
Livingstone's turaco, Tauraco livingstonii
Schalow's turaco, Tauraco schalowi
Black-billed turaco, Tauraco schuettii
Purple-crested turaco, Tauraco porphyreolophus
Rwenzori turaco, Ruwenzorornis johnstoni
Ross's turaco, Musophaga rossae
Bare-faced go-away-bird, Corythaixoides personatus
Eastern plantain-eater, Crinifer zonurus

Cuckoos
Order: CuculiformesFamily: Cuculidae

The family Cuculidae includes cuckoos, roadrunners and anis. These birds are of variable size with slender bodies, long tails and strong legs.

Senegal coucal, Centropus senegalensis
Blue-headed coucal, Centropus monachus
White-browed coucal, Centropus superciliosus
Black coucal, Centropus grillii
Blue malkoha, Ceuthmochares aereus
Great spotted cuckoo, Clamator glandarius (A)
Levaillant's cuckoo, Clamator levaillantii
Pied cuckoo, Clamator jacobinus
Thick-billed cuckoo, Pachycoccyx audeberti
Dideric cuckoo, Chrysococcyx caprius
Klaas's cuckoo, Chrysococcyx klaas
African emerald cuckoo, Chrysococcyx cupreus
Dusky long-tailed cuckoo, Cercococcyx mechowi
Barred long-tailed cuckoo, Cercococcyx montanus
Black cuckoo, Cuculus clamosus
Red-chested cuckoo, Cuculus solitarius
African cuckoo, Cuculus gularis
Madagascar cuckoo, Cuculus rochii (A)
Common cuckoo, Cuculus canorus

Nightjars and allies
Order: CaprimulgiformesFamily: Caprimulgidae

Nightjars are medium-sized nocturnal birds that usually nest on the ground. They have long wings, short legs and very short bills. Most have small feet, of little use for walking, and long pointed wings. Their soft plumage is camouflaged to resemble bark or leaves.

Pennant-winged nightjar, Caprimulgus vexillarius
Eurasian nightjar, Caprimulgus europaeus
Sombre nightjar, Caprimulgus fraenatus (A)
Rufous-cheeked nightjar, Caprimulgus rufigena
Fiery-necked nightjar, Caprimulgus pectoralis
Montane nightjar, Caprimulgus poliocephalus
Swamp nightjar, Caprimulgus natalensis
Plain nightjar, Caprimulgus inornatus (A)
Star-spotted nightjar, Caprimulgus stellatus
Freckled nightjar, Caprimulgus tristigma
Long-tailed nightjar, Caprimulgus climacurus
Square-tailed nightjar, Caprimulgus fossii

Swifts
Order: CaprimulgiformesFamily: Apodidae

Swifts are small birds which spend the majority of their lives flying. These birds have very short legs and never settle voluntarily on the ground, perching instead only on vertical surfaces. Many swifts have long swept-back wings which resemble a crescent or boomerang.

Scarce swift, Schoutedenapus myoptilus
Alpine swift, Apus melba (A)
Mottled swift, Apus aequatorialis (A)
Common swift, Apus apus
African swift, Apus barbatus
Little swift, Apus affinis
Horus swift, Apus horus
White-rumped swift, Apus caffer
African palm-swift, Cypsiurus parvus

Flufftails
Order: GruiformesFamily: Sarothruridae

The flufftails are a small family of ground-dwelling birds found only in Madagascar and sub-Saharan Africa.

White-spotted flufftail, Sarothrura pulchra
Buff-spotted flufftail, Sarothrura elegans (A)
Red-chested flufftail, Sarothrura rufa
Streaky-breasted flufftail, Sarothrura boehmi

Rails, gallinules, and coots
Order: GruiformesFamily: Rallidae

Rallidae is a large family of small to medium-sized birds which includes the rails, crakes, coots and gallinules. Typically they inhabit dense vegetation in damp environments near lakes, swamps or rivers. In general they are shy and secretive birds, making them difficult to observe. Most species have strong legs and long toes which are well adapted to soft uneven surfaces. They tend to have short, rounded wings and to be weak fliers.

African rail, Rallus caerulescens
Corn crake, Crex crex
African crake, Crex egregia
Spotted crake, Porzana porzana
Lesser moorhen, Paragallinula angulata
Eurasian moorhen, Gallinula chloropus
Red-knobbed coot, Fulica cristata (A)
Allen's gallinule, Porphyrio alleni
African swamphen, Porphyrio madagascariensis
Striped crake, Amaurornis marginalis
Black crake, Zapornia flavirostris
Little crake, Zapornia parva
Baillon's crake, Zapornia pusilla

Finfoots
Order: GruiformesFamily: Heliornithidae

Heliornithidae is a small family of tropical birds with webbed lobes on their feet similar to those of grebes and coots.

African finfoot, Podica senegalensis

Cranes
Order: GruiformesFamily: Gruidae

Cranes are large, long-legged and long-necked birds. Unlike the similar-looking but unrelated herons, cranes fly with necks outstretched, not pulled back. Most have elaborate and noisy courting displays or "dances". .

Gray crowned-crane, Balearica regulorum

Thick-knees
Order: CharadriiformesFamily: Burhinidae

The thick-knees are a group of largely tropical waders in the family Burhinidae. They are found worldwide within the tropical zone, with some species also breeding in temperate Europe and Australia. They are medium to large waders with strong black or yellow-black bills, large yellow eyes and cryptic plumage. Despite being classed as waders, most species have a preference for arid or semi-arid habitats.

Water thick-knee, Burhinus vermiculatus
Spotted thick-knee, Burhinus capensis

Egyptian plover
Order: CharadriiformesFamily: Pluvianidae

The Egyptian plover is found across equatorial Africa and along the Nile River.

Egyptian plover, Pluvianus aegyptius (A)

Stilts and avocets
Order: CharadriiformesFamily: Recurvirostridae

Recurvirostridae is a family of large wading birds, which includes the avocets and stilts. The avocets have long legs and long up-curved bills. The stilts have extremely long legs and long, thin, straight bills.

Black-winged stilt, Himantopus himantopus
Pied avocet, Recurvirostra avosetta (A)

Plovers and lapwings
Order: CharadriiformesFamily: Charadriidae

The family Charadriidae includes the plovers, dotterels and lapwings. They are small to medium-sized birds with compact bodies, short, thick necks and long, usually pointed, wings. They are found in open country worldwide, mostly in habitats near water.

Black-bellied plover, Pluvialis squatarola
Pacific golden-plover, Pluvialis fulva (A)
Long-toed lapwing, Vanellus crassirostris
Blacksmith lapwing, Vanellus armatus (A)
Spur-winged lapwing, Vanellus spinosus
White-headed lapwing, Vanellus albiceps
Senegal lapwing, Vanellus lugubris
Crowned lapwing, Vanellus coronatus
Wattled lapwing, Vanellus senegallus
Brown-chested lapwing, Vanellus superciliosus
Lesser sand-plover, Charadrius mongolus
Greater sand-plover, Charadrius leschenaultii (A)
Caspian plover, Charadrius asiaticus
Kittlitz's plover, Charadrius pecuarius
Kentish plover, Charadrius alexandrinus
Common ringed plover, Charadrius hiaticula
Little ringed plover, Charadrius dubius (A)
Three-banded plover, Charadrius tricollaris
Forbes's plover, Charadrius forbesi (A)
White-fronted plover, Charadrius marginatus

Painted-snipes
Order: CharadriiformesFamily: Rostratulidae

Painted-snipes are short-legged, long-billed birds similar in shape to the true snipes, but more brightly coloured.

Greater painted-snipe, Rostratula benghalensis

Jacanas
Order: CharadriiformesFamily: Jacanidae

The jacanas are a group of tropical waders in the family Jacanidae. They are found throughout the tropics. They are identifiable by their huge feet and claws which enable them to walk on floating vegetation in the shallow lakes that are their preferred habitat.

Lesser jacana, Microparra capensis
African jacana, Actophilornis africanus

Sandpipers and allies
Order: CharadriiformesFamily: Scolopacidae

Scolopacidae is a large diverse family of small to medium-sized shorebirds including the sandpipers, curlews, godwits, shanks, tattlers, woodcocks, snipes, dowitchers and phalaropes. The majority of these species eat small invertebrates picked out of the mud or soil. Variation in length of legs and bills enables multiple species to feed in the same habitat, particularly on the coast, without direct competition for food.

Whimbrel, Numenius phaeopus
Eurasian curlew, Numenius arquata (A)
Bar-tailed godwit, Limosa lapponica (A)
Black-tailed godwit, Limosa limosa (A)
Ruddy turnstone, Arenaria interpres
Ruff, Calidris pugnax
Broad-billed sandpiper, Calidris falcinellus
Curlew sandpiper, Calidris ferruginea
Temminck's stint, Calidris temminckii
Sanderling, Calidris alba
Dunlin, Calidris alpina (A)
Little stint, Calidris minuta
Pectoral sandpiper, Calidris melanotos (A)
Great snipe, Gallinago media
Common snipe, Gallinago gallinago
African snipe, Gallinago nigripennis
Terek sandpiper, Xenus cinereus (A)
Red-necked phalarope, Phalaropus lobatus (A)
Common sandpiper, Actitis hypoleucos
Green sandpiper, Tringa ochropus
Spotted redshank, Tringa erythropus
Common greenshank, Tringa nebularia
Marsh sandpiper, Tringa stagnatilis
Wood sandpiper, Tringa glareola
Common redshank, Tringa totanus

Buttonquails
Order: CharadriiformesFamily: Turnicidae

The buttonquails are small, drab, running birds which resemble the true quails. The female is the brighter of the sexes and initiates courtship. The male incubates the eggs and tends the young.

Small buttonquail, Turnix sylvaticus

Pratincoles and coursers
Order: CharadriiformesFamily: Glareolidae

Glareolidae is a family of wading birds comprising the pratincoles, which have short legs, long pointed wings and long forked tails, and the coursers, which have long legs, short wings and long, pointed bills which curve downwards.

Temminck's courser, Cursorius temminckii
Bronze-winged courser, Rhinoptilus chalcopterus
Collared pratincole, Glareola pratincola
Black-winged pratincole, Glareola nordmanni
Rock pratincole, Glareola nuchalis (A)

Gulls, terns, and skimmers
Order: CharadriiformesFamily: Laridae

Laridae is a family of medium to large seabirds, the gulls, terns, and skimmers. Gulls are typically grey or white, often with black markings on the head or wings. They have stout, longish bills and webbed feet. Terns are a group of generally medium to large seabirds typically with grey or white plumage, often with black markings on the head. Most terns hunt fish by diving but some pick insects off the surface of fresh water. Terns are generally long-lived birds, with several species known to live in excess of 30 years. Skimmers are a small family of tropical tern-like birds. They have an elongated lower mandible which they use to feed by flying low over the water surface and skimming the water for small fish.

Gray-hooded gull, Chroicocephalus cirrocephalus
Black-headed gull, Chroicocephalus ridibundus
Herring gull, Larus argentatus
Caspian gull, Larus cachinnans 
Lesser black-backed gull, Larus fuscus
Little tern, Sternula albifrons
Gull-billed tern, Gelochelidon nilotica
Caspian tern, Hydroprogne caspia (A)
Black tern, Chlidonias niger (A)
White-winged tern, Chlidonias leucopterus
Whiskered tern, Chlidonias hybrida (A)
Common tern, Sterna hirundo (A)
Lesser crested tern, Thalasseus bengalensis
African skimmer, Rynchops flavirostris

Storks
Order: CiconiiformesFamily: Ciconiidae

Storks are large, long-legged, long-necked, wading birds with long, stout bills. Storks are mute, but bill-clattering is an important mode of communication at the nest. Their nests can be large and may be reused for many years. Many species are migratory.

African openbill, Anastomus lamelligerus
Black stork, Ciconia nigra
Abdim's stork, Ciconia abdimii
African woolly-necked stork, Ciconia microscelis
White stork, Ciconia ciconia
Saddle-billed stork, Ephippiorhynchus senegalensis
Marabou stork, Leptoptilos crumenifer
Yellow-billed stork, Mycteria ibis

Anhingas
Order: SuliformesFamily: Anhingidae

Anhingas or darters are often called "snake-birds" because of their long thin neck, which gives a snake-like appearance when they swim with their bodies submerged. The males have black and dark-brown plumage, an erectile crest on the nape and a larger bill than the female. The females have much paler plumage especially on the neck and underparts. The darters have completely webbed feet and their legs are short and set far back on the body. Their plumage is somewhat permeable, like that of cormorants, and they spread their wings to dry after diving.

African darter, Anhinga rufa

Cormorants and shags
Order: SuliformesFamily: Phalacrocoracidae

Phalacrocoracidae is a family of medium to large coastal, fish-eating seabirds that includes cormorants and shags. Plumage colouration varies, with the majority having mainly dark plumage, some species being black-and-white and a few being colourful.

Long-tailed cormorant, Microcarbo africanus
Great cormorant, Phalacrocorax carbo

Pelicans
Order: PelecaniformesFamily: Pelecanidae

Pelicans are large water birds with a distinctive pouch under their beak. As with other members of the order Pelecaniformes, they have webbed feet with four toes.

Great white pelican, Pelecanus onocrotalus
Pink-backed pelican, Pelecanus rufescens

Shoebill
Order: PelecaniformesFamily: Balaenicipididae

The shoebill is a large bird related to the storks. It derives its name from its massive shoe-shaped bill.

Shoebill, Balaeniceps rex

Hammerkop
Order: PelecaniformesFamily: Scopidae

The hammerkop is a medium-sized bird with a long shaggy crest. The shape of its head with a curved bill and crest at the back is reminiscent of a hammer, hence its name. Its plumage is drab-brown all over.

Hamerkop, Scopus umbretta

Herons, egrets, and bitterns
Order: PelecaniformesFamily: Ardeidae

The family Ardeidae contains the bitterns, herons and egrets. Herons and egrets are medium to large wading birds with long necks and legs. Bitterns tend to be shorter necked and more wary. Members of Ardeidae fly with their necks retracted, unlike other long-necked birds such as storks, ibises and spoonbills.

Little bittern, Ixobrychus minutus
Dwarf bittern, Ixobrychus sturmii
Gray heron, Ardea cinerea
Black-headed heron, Ardea melanocephala
Goliath heron, Ardea goliath
Purple heron, Ardea purpurea
Great egret, Ardea alba
Intermediate egret, Ardea intermedia
Little egret, Egretta garzetta
Black heron, Egretta ardesiaca
Cattle egret, Bubulcus ibis
Squacco heron, Ardeola ralloides
Malagasy pond-heron, Ardeola idae
Rufous-bellied heron, Ardeola rufiventris
Striated heron, Butorides striata
Black-crowned night-heron, Nycticorax nycticorax
White-backed night-heron, Gorsachius leuconotus

Ibises and spoonbills
Order: PelecaniformesFamily: Threskiornithidae

Threskiornithidae is a family of large terrestrial and wading birds which includes the ibises and spoonbills. They have long, broad wings with 11 primary and about 20 secondary feathers. They are strong fliers and despite their size and weight, very capable soarers.

Glossy ibis, Plegadis falcinellus
African sacred ibis, Threskiornis aethiopicus
Spot-breasted ibis, Bostrychia rara
Hadada ibis, Bostrychia hagedash
African spoonbill, Platalea alba

Secretarybird
Order: AccipitriformesFamily: Sagittariidae

The secretarybird is a bird of prey in the order Falconiformes but is easily distinguished from other raptors by its long crane-like legs.

Secretarybird, Sagittarius serpentarius

Osprey
Order: AccipitriformesFamily: Pandionidae

The family Pandionidae contains only one species, the osprey. The osprey is a medium-large raptor which is a specialist fish-eater with a worldwide distribution.

Osprey, Pandion haliaetus

Hawks, eagles, and kites
Order: AccipitriformesFamily: Accipitridae

Accipitridae is a family of birds of prey, which includes hawks, eagles, kites, harriers and Old World vultures. These birds have powerful hooked beaks for tearing flesh from their prey, strong legs, powerful talons and keen eyesight.

Black-winged kite, Elanus caeruleus
Scissor-tailed kite, Chelictinia riocourii
African harrier-hawk, Polyboroides typus
Palm-nut vulture, Gypohierax angolensis
European honey-buzzard, Pernis apivorus (A)
White-headed vulture, Trigonoceps occipitalis
Lappet-faced vulture, Torgos tracheliotos (A)
Hooded vulture, Necrosyrtes monachus
White-backed vulture, Gyps africanus
Bateleur, Terathopius ecaudatus
Beaudouin's snake-eagle, Circaetus beaudouini
Black-chested snake-eagle, Circaetus pectoralis
Brown snake-eagle, Circaetus cinereus
Banded snake-eagle, Circaetus cinerascens
Bat hawk, Macheiramphus alcinus
Crowned eagle, Stephanoaetus coronatus
Martial eagle, Polemaetus bellicosus
Long-crested eagle, Lophaetus occipitalis
Lesser spotted eagle, Clanga pomarina
Wahlberg's eagle, Hieraaetus wahlbergi
Booted eagle, Hieraaetus pennatus
Ayres's hawk-eagle, Hieraaetus ayresii
Tawny eagle, Aquila rapax
Steppe eagle, Aquila nipalensis (A)
Cassin's hawk-eagle, Aquila africana
Verreaux's eagle, Aquila verreauxii (A)
African hawk-eagle, Aquila spilogaster
Lizard buzzard, Kaupifalco monogrammicus
Dark chanting-goshawk, Melierax metabates
Gabar goshawk, Micronisus gabar
Grasshopper buzzard, Butastur rufipennis (A)
Eurasian marsh-harrier, Circus aeruginosus
African marsh-harrier, Circus ranivorus
Pallid harrier, Circus macrourus
Montagu's harrier, Circus pygargus
African goshawk, Accipiter tachiro
Chestnut-flanked sparrowhawk, Accipiter castanilius
Shikra, Accipiter badius
Little sparrowhawk, Accipiter minullus
Ovambo sparrowhawk, Accipiter ovampensis
Black goshawk, Accipiter melanoleucus
Long-tailed hawk, Urotriorchis macrourus
Black kite, Milvus migrans
African fish-eagle, Haliaeetus vocifer
Common buzzard, Buteo buteo
Mountain buzzard, Buteo oreophilus
Augur buzzard, Buteo augur

Barn-owls
Order: StrigiformesFamily: Tytonidae

Barn-owls are medium to large owls with large heads and characteristic heart-shaped faces. They have long strong legs with powerful talons.

African grass-owl, Tyto capensis
Barn owl, Tyto alba

Owls
Order: StrigiformesFamily: Strigidae

The typical owls are small to large solitary nocturnal birds of prey. They have large forward-facing eyes and ears, a hawk-like beak and a conspicuous circle of feathers around each eye called a facial disk.

Eurasian scops-owl, Otus scops
African scops-owl, Otus senegalensis
Southern white-faced owl, Ptilopsis granti
Spotted eagle-owl, Bubo africanus
Verreaux's eagle-owl, Bubo lacteus
Pearl-spotted owlet, Glaucidium perlatum
Red-chested owlet, Glaucidium tephronotum
African wood-owl, Strix woodfordii
Marsh owl, Asio capensis

Mousebirds
Order: ColiiformesFamily: Coliidae

The mousebirds are slender greyish or brown birds with soft, hairlike body feathers and very long thin tails. They are arboreal and scurry through the leaves like rodents in search of berries, fruit and buds. They are acrobatic and can feed upside down. All species have strong claws and reversible outer toes. They also have crests and stubby bills.

Speckled mousebird, Colius striatus
Blue-naped mousebird, Urocolius macrourus

Trogons
Order: TrogoniformesFamily: Trogonidae

The family Trogonidae includes trogons and quetzals. Found in tropical woodlands worldwide, they feed on insects and fruit, and their broad bills and weak legs reflect their diet and arboreal habits. Although their flight is fast, they are reluctant to fly any distance. Trogons have soft, often colourful, feathers with distinctive male and female plumage.

Narina trogon, Apaloderma narina

Hoopoes
Order: BucerotiformesFamily: Upupidae

Hoopoes have black, white and orangey-pink colouring with a large erectile crest on their head.

Eurasian hoopoe, Upupa epops

Woodhoopoes and scimitarbills
Order: BucerotiformesFamily: Phoeniculidae

The woodhoopoes are related to the kingfishers, rollers and hoopoes. They most resemble the hoopoes with their long curved bills, used to probe for insects, and short rounded wings. However, they differ in that they have metallic plumage, often blue, green or purple, and lack an erectile crest.

Green woodhoopoe, Phoeniculus purpureus
White-headed woodhoopoe, Phoeniculus bollei
Common scimitarbill, Rhinopomastus cyanomelas

Ground-hornbills
Order:Bucerotiformes Family: Bucorvidae

The ground-hornbills are terrestrial birds which feed almost entirely on insects, other birds, snakes, and amphibians.

Southern ground-hornbill, Bucorvus leadbeateri

Hornbills
Order: BucerotiformesFamily: Bucerotidae

Hornbills are a group of birds whose bill is shaped like a cow's horn, but without a twist, sometimes with a casque on the upper mandible. Frequently, the bill is brightly coloured.

Crowned hornbill, Lophoceros alboterminatus
African gray hornbill, Lophoceros nasutus
Black-and-white-casqued hornbill, Bycanistes subcylindricus
Trumpeter hornbill, Bycanistes bucinator

Kingfishers
Order: CoraciiformesFamily: Alcedinidae

Kingfishers are medium-sized birds with large heads, long, pointed bills, short legs and stubby tails.

Shining-blue kingfisher, Alcedo quadribrachys
Malachite kingfisher, Corythornis cristatus
African pygmy kingfisher, Ispidina picta
Gray-headed kingfisher, Halcyon leucocephala
Woodland kingfisher, Halcyon senegalensis
Blue-breasted kingfisher, Halcyon malimbica
Striped kingfisher, Halcyon chelicuti
Giant kingfisher, Megaceryle maximus
Pied kingfisher, Ceryle rudis

Bee-eaters
Order: CoraciiformesFamily: Meropidae

The bee-eaters are a group of near passerine birds in the family Meropidae. Most species are found in Africa but others occur in southern Europe, Madagascar, Australia and New Guinea. They are characterised by richly coloured plumage, slender bodies and usually elongated central tail feathers. All are colourful and have long downturned bills and pointed wings, which give them a swallow-like appearance when seen from afar.

White-fronted bee-eater, Merops bullockoides
Little bee-eater, Merops pusillus
Blue-breasted bee-eater, Merops variegatus
Cinnamon-chested bee-eater, Merops oreobates
Swallow-tailed bee-eater, Merops hirundineus
White-throated bee-eater, Merops albicollis
Blue-cheeked bee-eater, Merops persicus
Madagascar bee-eater, Merops superciliosus
European bee-eater, Merops apiaster
Northern carmine bee-eater, Merops nubicus (A)
Southern carmine bee-eater, Merops nubicoides

Rollers
Order: CoraciiformesFamily: Coraciidae

Rollers resemble crows in size and build, but are more closely related to the kingfishers and bee-eaters. They share the colourful appearance of those groups with blues and browns predominating. The two inner front toes are connected, but the outer toe is not.

European roller, Coracias garrulus
Lilac-breasted roller, Coracias caudata
Broad-billed roller, Eurystomus glaucurus

African barbets
Order: PiciformesFamily: Lybiidae

The African barbets are plump birds, with short necks and large heads. They get their name from the bristles which fringe their heavy bills. Most species are brightly coloured.

Yellow-billed barbet, Trachyphonus purpuratus
Crested barbet, Trachyphonus vaillantii
Gray-throated barbet, Gymnobucco bonapartei
Yellow-rumped tinkerbird, Pogoniulus bilineatus
Red-fronted tinkerbird, Pogoniulus pusillus
Yellow-fronted tinkerbird, Pogoniulus chrysoconus
Spot-flanked barbet, Tricholaema lachrymosa
Red-faced barbet, Lybius rubrifacies
Black-collared barbet, Lybius torquatus
Black-backed barbet, Lybius minor
Double-toothed barbet, Lybius bidentatus

Honeyguides
Order: PiciformesFamily: Indicatoridae

Honeyguides are among the few birds that feed on wax. They are named for the greater honeyguide which leads traditional honey-hunters to bees' nests and, after the hunters have harvested the honey, feeds on the remaining contents of the hive.

Wahlberg's honeyguide, Prodotiscus regulus
Dwarf honeyguide, Indicator pumilio
Least honeyguide, Indicator exilis
Lesser honeyguide, Indicator minor
Scaly-throated honeyguide, Indicator variegatus
Greater honeyguide, Indicator indicator

Woodpeckers
Order: PiciformesFamily: Picidae

Woodpeckers are small to medium-sized birds with chisel-like beaks, short legs, stiff tails and long tongues used for capturing insects. Some species have feet with two toes pointing forward and two backward, while several species have only three toes. Many woodpeckers have the habit of tapping noisily on tree trunks with their beaks.

Rufous-necked wryneck, Jynx ruficollis
Elliot's woodpecker, Chloropicus elliotii
Cardinal woodpecker, Chloropicus fuscescens
Bearded woodpecker, Chloropicus namaquus
African gray woodpecker, Chloropicus goertae
Olive woodpecker, Chloropicus griseocephalus
Brown-eared woodpecker, Campethera caroli
Tullberg's woodpecker, Campethera tullbergi
Green-backed woodpecker, Campethera cailliautii
Bennett's woodpecker, Campethera bennettii
Golden-tailed woodpecker, Campethera abingoni

Falcons and caracaras
Order: FalconiformesFamily: Falconidae

Falconidae is a family of diurnal birds of prey. They differ from hawks, eagles and kites in that they kill with their beaks instead of their talons.

Lesser kestrel, Falco naumanni
Eurasian kestrel, Falco tinnunculus
Gray kestrel, Falco ardosiaceus
Red-necked falcon, Falco chicquera
Red-footed falcon, Falco vespertinus
Amur falcon, Falco amurensis
Eleonora's falcon, Falco eleonorae
Sooty falcon, Falco concolor (A)
Eurasian hobby, Falco subbuteo
African hobby, Falco cuvierii (A)
Lanner falcon, Falco biarmicus
Saker falcon, Falco cherrug (A)
Peregrine falcon, Falco peregrinus

Old World parrots
Order: PsittaciformesFamily: Psittaculidae

Parrots are small to large birds with a characteristic curved beak. Their upper mandibles have slight mobility in the joint with the skull and they have a generally erect stance. All parrots are zygodactyl, having the four toes on each foot placed two at the front and two to the back.

Red-headed lovebird, Agapornis pullarius
Fischer's lovebird, Agapornis fischeri (A)
Yellow-collared lovebird, Agapornis personatus (I)

African and New World parrots
Order: PsittaciformesFamily: Psittacidae.

Characteristic features of parrots include a strong curved bill, an upright stance, strong legs, and clawed zygodactyl feet. Many parrots are vividly coloured, and some are multi-coloured. Most of the more than 150 species in this family are found in the New World.

Gray parrot, Psittacus erithacus
Brown-necked parrot, Poicephalus robustus
Meyer's parrot, Poicephalus meyeri

African and green broadbills
Order: PasseriformesFamily: Calyptomenidae

The broadbills are small, brightly coloured birds, which feed on fruit and also take insects in flycatcher fashion, snapping their broad bills. Their habitat is canopies of wet forests.

African broadbill, Smithornis capensis

Pittas
Order: PasseriformesFamily: Pittidae

Pittas are medium-sized by passerine standards and are stocky, with fairly long, strong legs, short tails and stout bills. Many are brightly coloured. They spend the majority of their time on wet forest floors, eating snails, insects and similar invertebrates. There are 32 species worldwide and 1 species which occurs in Burundi.

African pitta, Pitta angolensis

Cuckooshrikes
Order: PasseriformesFamily: Campephagidae

The cuckooshrikes are small to medium-sized passerine birds. They are predominantly greyish with white and black, although some species are brightly coloured.

Gray cuckooshrike, Coracina caesia
White-breasted cuckooshrike, Coracina pectoralis
Black cuckooshrike, Campephaga flava

Old World orioles
Order: PasseriformesFamily: Oriolidae

The Old World orioles are colourful passerine birds. They are not related to the New World orioles.

Eurasian golden oriole, Oriolus oriolus
African golden oriole, Oriolus auratus
African black-headed oriole, Oriolus larvatus
Black-tailed oriole, Oriolus percivali

Wattle-eyes and batises
Order: PasseriformesFamily: Platysteiridae

The wattle-eyes, or puffback flycatchers, are small stout passerine birds of the African tropics. They get their name from the brightly coloured fleshy eye decorations found in most species in this group.

Brown-throated wattle-eye, Platysteira cyanea
Black-throated wattle-eye, Platysteira peltata
Yellow-bellied wattle-eye, Platysteira concreta
Rwenzori batis, Batis diops
Chinspot batis, Batis molitor
Western black-headed batis, Batis erlangeri

Vangas, helmetshrikes, and allies 
Order: PasseriformesFamily: Vangidae

The helmetshrikes are similar in build to the shrikes, but tend to be colourful species with distinctive crests or other head ornaments, such as wattles, from which they get their name.

White helmetshrike, Prionops plumatus
Black-and-white shrike-flycatcher, Bias musicus

Bushshrikes and allies
Order: PasseriformesFamily: Malaconotidae

Bushshrikes are similar in habits to shrikes, hunting insects and other small prey from a perch on a bush. Although similar in build to the shrikes, these tend to be either colourful species or largely black; some species are quite secretive. There are 19 species which have been recorded in Burundi.

Brubru, Nilaus afer
Northern puffback, Dryoscopus gambensis
Black-backed puffback, Dryoscopus cubla
Red-eyed puffback, Dryoscopus senegalensis
Pink-footed puffback, Dryoscopus angolensis
Marsh tchagra, Tchagra minuta
Black-crowned tchagra, Tchagra senegala
Brown-crowned tchagra, Tchagra australis
Lühder's bushshrike, Laniarius luehderi
Tropical boubou, Laniarius major
Black-headed gonolek, Laniarius erythrogaster
Papyrus gonolek, Laniarius mufumbiri
Willard's sooty boubou, Laniarius willardi
Albertine boubou, Laniarius holomelas
Fülleborn's boubou, Laniarius fuelleborni
Sulphur-breasted bushshrike, Telophorus sulfureopectus
Doherty's bushshrike, Telophorus dohertyi
Lagden's bushshrike, Malaconotus lagdeni
Gray-headed bushshrike, Malaconotus blanchoti

Drongos
Order: PasseriformesFamily: Dicruridae

The drongos are mostly black or dark grey in colour, sometimes with metallic tints. They have long forked tails, and some Asian species have elaborate tail decorations. They have short legs and sit very upright when perched, like a shrike. They flycatch or take prey from the ground.

Fork-tailed drongo, Dicrurus adsimilis

Monarch flycatchers
Order: PasseriformesFamily: Monarchidae

The monarch flycatchers are small to medium-sized insectivorous passerines which hunt by flycatching.

African crested-flycatcher, Trochocercus cyanomelas
African paradise-flycatcher, Terpsiphone viridis

Shrikes
Order: PasseriformesFamily: Laniidae

Shrikes are passerine birds known for their habit of catching other birds and small animals and impaling the uneaten portions of their bodies on thorns. A typical shrike's beak is hooked, like a bird of prey.

Red-backed shrike, Lanius collurio
Isabelline shrike, Lanius isabellinus (A)
Great gray shrike, Lanius excubitor 
Lesser gray shrike, Lanius minor (A)
Gray-backed fiscal, Lanius excubitoroides
Mackinnon's shrike, Lanius mackinnoni
Northern fiscal, Lanius humeralis
Souza's shrike, Lanius souzae
Woodchat shrike, Lanius senator (A)

Crows, jays, and magpies
Order: PasseriformesFamily: Corvidae

The family Corvidae includes crows, ravens, jays, choughs, magpies, treepies, nutcrackers and ground jays. Corvids are above average in size among the Passeriformes, and some of the larger species show high levels of intelligence.

Pied crow, Corvus albus
White-necked raven, Corvus albicollis

Hyliotas
Order: PasseriformesFamily: Hyliotidae

The members of this small family, all of genus Hyliota, are birds of the forest canopy. They tend to feed in mixed-species flocks.

Yellow-bellied hyliota, Hyliota flavigaster
Violet-backed hyliota, Hyliota violacea

Fairy flycatchers
Order: PasseriformesFamily: Stenostiridae

Most of the species of this small family are found in Africa, though a few inhabit tropical Asia. They are not closely related to other birds called "flycatchers".

African blue flycatcher, Elminia longicauda
White-tailed blue flycatcher, Elminia albicauda
White-bellied crested-flycatcher, Elminia albiventris
White-tailed crested-flycatcher, Elminia albonotata

Tits, chickadees, and titmice
Order: PasseriformesFamily: Paridae

The Paridae are mainly small stocky woodland species with short stout bills. Some have crests. They are adaptable birds, with a mixed diet including seeds and insects.

White-winged black-tit, Melaniparus leucomelas
Stripe-breasted tit, Melaniparus fasciiventer

Penduline-tits
Order: PasseriformesFamily: Remizidae

The penduline-tits are a group of small passerine birds related to the true tits. They are insectivores.

African penduline-tit, Anthoscopus caroli

Larks
Order: PasseriformesFamily: Alaudidae

Larks are small terrestrial birds with often extravagant songs and display flights. Most larks are fairly dull in appearance. Their food is insects and seeds. There are 91 species worldwide and 4 species which occur in Burundi.

Dusky lark, Pinarocorys nigricans (A)
Fischer's sparrow-lark, Eremopterix leucopareia
Rufous-naped lark, Mirafra africana
Flappet lark, Mirafra rufocinnamomea
Red-capped lark, Calandrella cinerea

African warblers
Order: PasseriformesFamily: Macrosphenidae

African warblers are small to medium-sized insectivores which are found in a wide variety of habitats south of the Sahara.

White-browed crombec, Sylvietta leucophrys
Red-faced crombec, Sylvietta whytii
Cape crombec, Sylvietta rufescens
Moustached grass-warbler, Melocichla mentalis
Grauer's warbler, Graueria vittata
Green hylia, Hylia prasina

Cisticolas and allies
Order: PasseriformesFamily: Cisticolidae

The Cisticolidae are warblers found mainly in warmer southern regions of the Old World. They are generally very small birds of drab brown or grey appearance found in open country such as grassland or scrub.

Greencap eremomela, Eremomela scotops
White-chinned prinia, Schistolais leucopogon
Black-collared apalis, Oreolais pulchra
Rwenzori apalis, Oreolais ruwenzori
Green-backed camaroptera, Camaroptera brachyura
Olive-green camaroptera, Camaroptera chloronota
Black-throated apalis, Apalis jacksoni
Black-faced apalis, Apalis personata
Yellow-breasted apalis, Apalis flavida
Buff-throated apalis, Apalis rufogularis
Kungwe apalis, Apalis argentea
Chestnut-throated apalis, Apalis porphyrolaema
Gray apalis, Apalis cinerea
Tawny-flanked prinia, Prinia subflava
Banded prinia, Prinia bairdii
Black-faced rufous-warbler, Bathmocercus rufus (A)
Gray-capped warbler, Eminia lepida
Red-faced cisticola, Cisticola erythrops
Singing cisticola, Cisticola cantans
Whistling cisticola, Cisticola lateralis
Trilling cisticola, Cisticola woosnami
Chubb's cisticola, Cisticola chubbi
Rattling cisticola, Cisticola chiniana
Chirping cisticola, Cisticola pipiens
Winding cisticola, Cisticola marginatus
Rufous-winged cisticola, Cisticola galactotes
Carruthers's cisticola, Cisticola carruthersi
Levaillant's cisticola, Cisticola tinniens
Stout cisticola, Cisticola robustus
Croaking cisticola, Cisticola natalensis
Siffling cisticola, Cisticola brachypterus
Zitting cisticola, Cisticola juncidis
Wing-snapping cisticola, Cisticola ayresii

Reed warblers and allies
Order: PasseriformesFamily: Acrocephalidae

The members of this family are usually rather large for "warblers". Most are rather plain olivaceous brown above with much yellow to beige below. They are usually found in open woodland, reedbeds, or tall grass. The family occurs mostly in southern to western Eurasia and surroundings, but it also ranges far into the Pacific, with some species in Africa.

Papyrus yellow-warbler, Calamonastides gracilirostris
Eastern olivaceous warbler, Iduna pallida (A)
African yellow-warbler, Iduna natalensis
Mountain yellow-warbler, Iduna similis
Icterine warbler, Hippolais icterina
Sedge warbler, Acrocephalus schoenobaenus
Marsh warbler, Acrocephalus palustris
Common reed warbler, Acrocephalus scirpaceus
Lesser swamp warbler, Acrocephalus gracilirostris
Greater swamp warbler, Acrocephalus rufescens
Great reed warbler, Acrocephalus arundinaceus

Grassbirds and allies
Order: PasseriformesFamily: Locustellidae

Locustellidae are a family of small insectivorous songbirds found mainly in Eurasia, Africa, and the Australian region. They are smallish birds with tails that are usually long and pointed, and tend to be drab brownish or buffy all over.

Fan-tailed grassbird, Catriscus brevirostris
Cinnamon bracken-warbler, Bradypterus cinnamomeus
White-winged swamp warbler, Bradypterus carpalis
Grauer's swamp warbler, Bradypterus graueri
Highland rush warbler, Bradypterus centralis

Swallows
Order: PasseriformesFamily: Hirundinidae

The family Hirundinidae is adapted to aerial feeding. They have a slender streamlined body, long pointed wings and a short bill with a wide gape. The feet are adapted to perching rather than walking, and the front toes are partially joined at the base.

Plain martin, Riparia paludicola
Bank swallow, Riparia riparia
Banded martin, Neophedina cincta
Rock martin, Ptyonoprogne fuligula
Barn swallow, Hirundo rustica
Angola swallow, Hirundo angolensis
Wire-tailed swallow, Hirundo smithii
Red-rumped swallow, Cecropis daurica
Lesser striped swallow, Cecropis abyssinica
Rufous-chested swallow, Cecropis semirufa
Mosque swallow, Cecropis senegalensis
Common house-martin, Delichon urbicum
White-headed sawwing, Psalidoprocne albiceps
Black sawwing, Psalidoprocne pristoptera
Gray-rumped swallow, Pseudhirundo griseopyga

Bulbuls
Order: PasseriformesFamily: Pycnonotidae

Bulbuls are medium-sized songbirds. Some are colourful with yellow, red or orange vents, cheeks, throats or supercilia, but most are drab, with uniform olive-brown to black plumage. Some species have distinct crests.

Slender-billed greenbul, Stelgidillas gracilirostris
Shelley's greenbul, Arizelocichla masukuensis
Eastern mountain greenbul, Arizelocichla nigriceps
Yellow-throated greenbul, Atimastillas flavicollis
Yellow-whiskered greenbul, Eurillas latirostris
Little greenbul, Eurillas virens
Cabanis's greenbul, Phyllastrephus cabanisi
Yellow-streaked bulbul, Phyllastrephus flavostriatus
Common bulbul, Pycnonotus barbatus

Leaf warblers
Order: PasseriformesFamily: Phylloscopidae

Leaf warblers are a family of small insectivorous birds found mostly in Eurasia and ranging into Wallacea and Africa. The species are of various sizes, often green-plumaged above and yellow below, or more subdued with grayish-green to grayish-brown colors.

Willow warbler, Phylloscopus trochilus
Brown woodland-warbler, Phylloscopus umbrovirens
Red-faced woodland-warbler, Phylloscopus laetus

Bush warblers and allies
Order: PasseriformesFamily: Scotocercidae

The members of this family are found throughout Africa, Asia, and Polynesia. Their taxonomy is in flux, and some authorities place genus Erythrocerus in another family.

Neumann's warbler, Urosphena neumanni  (A)

Sylviid warblers, parrotbills, and allies
Order: PasseriformesFamily: Sylviidae

The family Sylviidae is a group of small insectivorous passerine birds. They mainly occur as breeding species, as the common name implies, in Europe, Asia and, to a lesser extent, Africa. Most are of generally undistinguished appearance, but many have distinctive songs.
 
Eurasian blackcap, Sylvia atricapilla
Garden warbler, Sylvia borin
Rwenzori hill babbler, Sylvia atriceps

White-eyes, yuhinas, and allies
Order: PasseriformesFamily: Zosteropidae

The white-eyes are small and mostly undistinguished, their plumage above being generally some dull colour like greenish-olive, but some species have a white or bright yellow throat, breast or lower parts, and several have buff flanks. As their name suggests, many species have a white ring around each eye.

Green white-eye, Zosterops stuhlmanni
Northern yellow white-eye, Zosterops senegalensis

Ground babblers and allies
Order: PasseriformesFamily: Pellorneidae

These small to medium-sized songbirds have soft fluffy plumage but are otherwise rather diverse. Members of the genus Illadopsis are found in forests, but some other genera are birds of scrublands.

Brown illadopsis, Illadopsis fulvescens
Pale-breasted illadopsis, Illadopsis rufipennis
Mountain illadopsis, Illadopsis pyrrhoptera
Scaly-breasted illadopsis, Illadopsis albipectus

Laughingthrushes and allies
Order: PasseriformesFamily: Leiothrichidae

The members of this family are diverse in size and colouration, though those of genus Turdoides tend to be brown or greyish. The family is found in Africa, India, and southeast Asia.

Brown babbler, Turdoides plebejus
Arrow-marked babbler, Turdoides jardineii
Hartlaub's babbler, Turdoides hartlaubii
Black-lored babbler, Turdoides sharpei

Oxpeckers
Order: PasseriformesFamily: Buphagidae

As both the English and scientific names of these birds imply, they feed on ectoparasites, primarily ticks, found on large mammals.

Red-billed oxpecker, Buphagus erythrorynchus
Yellow-billed oxpecker, Buphagus africanus

Starlings
Order: PasseriformesFamily: Sturnidae

Starlings are small to medium-sized passerine birds. Their flight is strong and direct and they are very gregarious. Their preferred habitat is fairly open country. They eat insects and fruit. Plumage is typically dark with a metallic sheen.

Wattled starling, Creatophora cinerea
Violet-backed starling, Cinnyricinclus leucogaster
Slender-billed starling, Onychognathus tenuirostris
Chestnut-winged starling, Onychognathus fulgidus
Waller's starling, Onychognathus walleri
Sharpe's starling, Poeoptera sharpii
Stuhlmann's starling, Poeoptera stuhlmanni
Purple-headed starling, Hylopsar purpureiceps
Rüppell's starling, Lamprotornis purpuropterus
Splendid starling, Lamprotornis splendidus
Lesser blue-eared starling, Lamprotornis chloropterus
Greater blue-eared starling, Lamprotornis chalybaeus

Thrushes and allies
Order: PasseriformesFamily: Turdidae

The thrushes are a group of passerine birds that occur mainly in the Old World. They are plump, soft plumaged, small to medium-sized insectivores or sometimes omnivores, often feeding on the ground. Many have attractive songs.

Rufous flycatcher-thrush, Neocossyphus fraseri
Abyssinian ground-thrush, Geokichla piaggiae
Abyssinian thrush, Turdus abyssinicus
Kurrichane thrush, Turdus libonyana
African thrush, Turdus pelios

Old World flycatchers
Order: PasseriformesFamily: Muscicapidae

Old World flycatchers are a large group of small passerine birds native to the Old World. They are mainly small arboreal insectivores. The appearance of these birds is highly varied, but they mostly have weak songs and harsh calls.

African dusky flycatcher, Muscicapa adusta
Spotted flycatcher, Muscicapa striata
Swamp flycatcher, Muscicapa aquatica
Dusky-blue flycatcher, Bradornis comitatus
Pale flycatcher, Agricola pallidus
Gray tit-flycatcher, Fraseria plumbea
Ashy flycatcher, Fraseria caerulescens
Yellow-eyed black-flycatcher, Melaenornis ardesiacus
Southern black-flycatcher, Melaenornis pammelaina
White-eyed slaty-flycatcher, Melaenornis fischeri
Miombo scrub-robin, Cercotrichas barbata
Brown-backed scrub-robin, Cercotrichas hartlaubi
Red-backed scrub-robin, Cercotrichas leucophrys
White-bellied robin-chat, Cossyphicula roberti
Archer's robin-chat, Cossypha archeri
Gray-winged robin-chat, Cossypha polioptera
White-browed robin-chat, Cossypha heuglini
Red-capped robin-chat, Cossypha natalensis
Snowy-crowned robin-chat, Cossypha niveicapilla
Collared palm-thrush, Cichladusa arquata
White-starred robin, Pogonocichla stellata
Brown-chested alethe, Chamaetylas poliocephala
Red-throated alethe, Chamaetylas poliophrys
Yellow-breasted forest robin, Stiphrornis mabirae
Equatorial akalat, Sheppardia aequatorialis
Semicollared flycatcher, Ficedula semitorquata
Collared flycatcher, Ficedula albicollis
Rufous-tailed rock-thrush, Monticola saxatilis
Miombo rock-thrush, Monticola angolensis
Whinchat, Saxicola rubetra
African stonechat, Saxicola torquatus
Mocking cliff-chat, Thamnolaea cinnamomeiventris
Sooty chat, Myrmecocichla nigra
Arnot's chat, Myrmecocichla arnotti
Northern wheatear, Oenanthe oenanthe
White-fronted black-chat, Oenanthe albifrons
Familiar chat, Oenanthe familiaris

Dapple-throat and allies
Order: PasseriformesFamily: Modulatricidae

This species and two others, all of different genera, were formerly placed in family Promeropidae, the sugarbirds, but were accorded their own family in 2017.

Gray-chested babbler, Kakamega poliothorax

Sunbirds and spiderhunters
Order: PasseriformesFamily: Nectariniidae

The sunbirds and spiderhunters are very small passerine birds which feed largely on nectar, although they will also take insects, especially when feeding young. Flight is fast and direct on their short wings. Most species can take nectar by hovering like a hummingbird, but usually perch to feed.

Gray-headed sunbird, Deleornis axillaris
Western violet-backed sunbird, Anthreptes longuemarei
Collared sunbird, Hedydipna collaris
Green-headed sunbird, Cyanomitra verticalis
Blue-headed sunbird, Cyanomitra alinae
Olive sunbird, Cyanomitra olivacea
Green-throated sunbird, Chalcomitra rubescens
Amethyst sunbird, Chalcomitra amethystina
Scarlet-chested sunbird, Chalcomitra senegalensis
Purple-breasted sunbird, Nectarinia purpureiventris
Bronze sunbird, Nectarinia kilimensis
Malachite sunbird, Nectarinia famosa
Olive-bellied sunbird, Cinnyris chloropygius
Stuhlmann's sunbird, Cinnyris stuhlmanni
Northern double-collared sunbird, Cinnyris preussi
Regal sunbird, Cinnyris regius
Mariqua sunbird, Cinnyris mariquensis
Red-chested sunbird, Cinnyris erythrocerca
Variable sunbird, Cinnyris venustus
Copper sunbird, Cinnyris cupreus

Weavers and allies
Order: PasseriformesFamily: Ploceidae

The weavers are small passerine birds related to the finches. They are seed-eating birds with rounded conical bills. The males of many species are brightly coloured, usually in red or yellow and black, some species show variation in colour only in the breeding season.

Red-headed weaver, Anaplectes rubriceps
Baglafecht weaver, Ploceus baglafecht
Little weaver, Ploceus luteolus
Slender-billed weaver, Ploceus pelzelni
Black-necked weaver, Ploceus nigricollis
Spectacled weaver, Ploceus ocularis
Black-billed weaver, Ploceus melanogaster
Strange weaver, Ploceus alienus
Holub's golden-weaver, Ploceus xanthops
Northern brown-throated weaver, Ploceus castanops
Heuglin's masked-weaver, Ploceus heuglini
Vieillot's black weaver, Ploceus nigerrimus
Village weaver, Ploceus cucullatus
Black-headed weaver, Ploceus melanocephalus
Golden-backed weaver, Ploceus jacksoni
Forest weaver, Ploceus bicolor
Compact weaver, Pachyphantes superciliosus
Cardinal quelea, Quelea cardinalis
Red-headed quelea, Quelea erythrops
Red-billed quelea, Quelea quelea
Southern red bishop, Euplectes orix
Black-winged bishop, Euplectes hordeaceus
Yellow bishop, Euplectes capensis
White-winged widowbird, Euplectes albonotatus
Yellow-mantled widowbird, Euplectes macroura
Red-collared widowbird, Euplectes ardens
Fan-tailed widowbird, Euplectes axillaris
Grosbeak weaver, Amblyospiza albifrons

Waxbills and allies
Order: PasseriformesFamily: Estrildidae

The estrildid finches are small passerine birds of the Old World tropics and Australasia. They are gregarious and often colonial seed eaters with short thick but pointed bills. They are all similar in structure and habits, but have wide variation in plumage colours and patterns.

Bronze mannikin, Spermestes cucullatus
Magpie mannikin, Spermestes fringilloides
Black-and-white mannikin, Spermestes bicolor
White-collared oliveback, Nesocharis ansorgei
Yellow-bellied waxbill, Coccopygia quartinia
Green-backed twinspot, Mandingoa nitidula
Shelley's crimsonwing, Cryptospiza shelleyi
Dusky crimsonwing, Cryptospiza jacksoni
Abyssinian crimsonwing, Cryptospiza salvadorii
Red-faced crimsonwing, Cryptospiza reichenovii
Gray-headed nigrita, Nigrita canicapilla
Black-crowned waxbill, Estrilda nonnula
Black-headed waxbill, Estrilda atricapilla
Kandt's waxbill, Estrilda kandti
Orange-cheeked waxbill, Estrilda melpoda
Fawn-breasted waxbill, Estrilda paludicola
Common waxbill, Estrilda astrild
Crimson-rumped waxbill, Estrilda rhodopyga
Quailfinch, Ortygospiza atricollis
Zebra waxbill, Amandava subflava
Southern cordonbleu, Uraeginthus angolensis
Red-cheeked cordonbleu, Uraeginthus bengalus
Red-headed bluebill, Spermophaga ruficapilla
Green-winged pytilia, Pytilia melba
Orange-winged pytilia, Pytilia afra
Dusky twinspot, Euschistospiza cinereovinacea
Peters's twinspot, Hypargos niveoguttatus
Red-billed firefinch, Lagonosticta senegala
African firefinch, Lagonosticta rubricata

Indigobirds
Order: PasseriformesFamily: Viduidae

The indigobirds are finch-like species which usually have black or indigo predominating in their plumage. All are brood parasites, which lay their eggs in the nests of estrildid finches.

Pin-tailed whydah, Vidua macroura
Broad-tailed paradise-whydah, Vidua obtusa
Village indigobird, Vidua chalybeata
Variable indigobird, Vidua funerea
Parasitic weaver, Anomalospiza imberbis

Old World sparrows
Order: PasseriformesFamily: Passeridae

Old World sparrows are small passerine birds. In general, sparrows tend to be small, plump, brown or grey birds with short tails and short powerful beaks. Sparrows are seed eaters, but they also consume small insects.

House sparrow, Passer domesticus (I)
Northern gray-headed sparrow, Passer griseus
Yellow-throated bush sparrow, Gymnoris superciliaris

Wagtails and pipits
Order: PasseriformesFamily: Motacillidae

Motacillidae is a family of small passerine birds with medium to long tails. They include the wagtails, longclaws and pipits. They are slender, ground feeding insectivores of open country.

Cape wagtail, Motacilla capensis
Mountain wagtail, Motacilla clara
Gray wagtail, Motacilla cinerea (A)
Western yellow wagtail, Motacilla flava
African pied wagtail, Motacilla aguimp
White wagtail, Motacilla alba
African pipit, Anthus cinnamomeus
Woodland pipit, Anthus nyassae
Long-billed pipit, Anthus similis
Plain-backed pipit, Anthus leucophrys
Striped pipit, Anthus lineiventris
Tree pipit, Anthus trivialis
Red-throated pipit, Anthus cervinus
Short-tailed pipit, Anthus brachyurus (A)
Yellow-throated longclaw, Macronyx croceus

Finches, euphonias, and allies
Order: PasseriformesFamily: Fringillidae

Finches are seed-eating passerine birds, that are small to moderately large and have a strong beak, usually conical and in some species very large. All have twelve tail feathers and nine primaries. These birds have a bouncing flight with alternating bouts of flapping and gliding on closed wings, and most sing well.

Oriole finch, Linurgus olivaceus
Yellow-fronted canary, Crithagra mozambicus
Western citril, Crithagra frontalis
Black-faced canary, Crithagra capistratus
Papyrus canary, Crithagra koliensis
Black-throated canary, Crithagra atrogularis
Brimstone canary, Crithagra sulphuratus
Streaky seedeater, Crithagra striolatus
Thick-billed seedeater, Crithagra burtoni
Reichard's seedeater, Crithagra reichardi
Yellow-crowned canary, Serinus flavivertex

Old World buntings
Order: PasseriformesFamily: Emberizidae

The emberizids are a large family of passerine birds. They are seed-eating birds with distinctively shaped bills.  Many emberizid species have distinctive head patterns.

Golden-breasted bunting, Emberiza flaviventris
Cinnamon-breasted bunting, Emberiza tahapisi

See also
List of birds
Lists of birds by region

References

External links
Birds of Burundi - World Institute for Conservation and Environment

Burundi
Burundi
Birds
Burundi